was a Japanese economist who was a specialist in the Japanese economy.

After graduating from the Economics Department of Tokyo University, he worked as an assistant, lecturer, and assistant professor in the Education Department of the same university before becoming a professor in 1970. After retiring in 1986, he became a professor emeritus at his alma mater, and professor at Ochanomizu Women's University and Toyo Eiwa University.

Between 1977 and 1979 he was director of the Economic Research Division of the now-defunct Economic Planning Agency.

He died of hepatitis on September 26, 2013.

Works

Books 
  Lectures on Modern Japanese Economic History 1926–1994. LTCB International
  The Postwar Japanese Economy
  Economic growth in prewar Japan
  A History of Showa Japan, 1926–1989
  The Economic History of Japan: 1600–1990: Volume 3
  The Tarnished Phoenix
  Liberalization of Postwar Japanese Economy
  The Postwar Japanese Economy: Its Development and Structure, 1937–1994
  Japanese Economic Development from 1945 to the Present: Three Lectures
1965）
1968）
1970）
1971）
1975）
1978／1994）
1979／2 1980／3 1993）
  Economic Growth in Prewar Japan  (1983, hardcover)（）
1985）
1986／2007）
1991）
1993。2012）
1995）
2000）

Co-author 
  Takafusa Nakamura, Bernard R. G. Grace: Economic development of modern Japan
  James William Morley, Takafusa Nakamura, Janet Hunter: Interwar Japan
  Saburō Ōkita, Takafusa Nakamura: Postwar reconstruction of the Japanese economy
  Takafusa Nakamura, Edwin Whenmouth: A History of Shōwa Japan, 1926–1989
  Takafusa Nakamura, Kōnosuke Odaka: The Economic History of Japan, 1600–1990: Economic history of Japan, 1914–1955
198321992

Editor 
1979）
1981）
（7）1989）
1993）
1997）

Co-editor 
（43-44）1970-1974）
（1-4）1971-1972）
19771983）
1979）
1980）
1983）
1986）
（6）1989）
（1）1990）
（2）1990）
（3）1990）
1995）
19501997）
2002）
2003）
2005）

Translator 
 M・M・1969）
 1980）

General editor 
GHQ551997-2000）
591999-2002）

Awards 
 (2004) Japan Academy Award for A History of Showa Japan，1926–1989
 (2003) Osaragi Jiro Award for 昭和史(I・II) ("Showa History, Vol. I and II")

References 

Takafusa Nakamura at PHP 
Obituary in Sankei Shimbun 

1925 births
2013 deaths
20th-century Japanese economists
21st-century Japanese economists
University of Tokyo alumni